Helcystogramma rectangulum is a moth in the family Gelechiidae. It was described by Hou-Hun Li and Hui Zhen in 2011. It is found in the Chinese provinces of Guizhou, Hunan, Shaanxi and Sichuan.

The wingspan is 13–17 mm. The forewings are greyish brown to brown with scattered dark brown scales and with the termen dark brown. There are black scale tufts at the middle and end of the cell, as well as at the middle of the fold. There is also a narrow yellowish-brown fascia from the costal six-sevenths to before the tornus. The hindwings are grey.

Etymology
The species name refers to the vinculum with the inner margin projecting and forming a right angle mesially and is derived from Latin rectangulus (meaning right angled).

References

Moths described in 2011
rectangulum
Moths of Asia